The 1984 Camus Malaysian Masters was a professional non-ranking snooker tournament held in August 1984 in Malaysia.

The event was held as a round robin with each player playing each other once. Professionals Steve Davis, Terry Griffiths and Tony Meo participated along with two local players. Terry Griffiths won the tournament by virtue of finishing top of the round robin league table, winning three and drawing one of his matches.

Results

References

Malaysian Masters (snooker)
1984 in snooker
1984 in Malaysian sport